Diane Chase is a Canadian country music artist. Chase has released three studio albums, 2000's In the Middle of Something, 2004's The Ride and 2009's Gettin' There. Her debut album produced two charting singles on the RPM Country Tracks chart in Canada, of which the highest was the No. 11-peaking title track.

Discography

Albums

Singles

Music videos

Awards and nominations

References

Canadian women country singers
Living people
Musicians from Greater Sudbury
Year of birth missing (living people)